Dale Goodin (born October 13, 1958) is an American politician serving as a member of the Mississippi House of Representatives from the 105th district. Elected in November 2019, he assumed office on January 7, 2020.

Early life and education 
Goodin was born in New Orleans and attended New Augusta High School in New Augusta, Mississippi. He earned an Associate of Applied Science in business administration from Mercer County Community College, a Bachelor of Arts from Western Illinois University, and a Master of Science in educational leadership from the University of Southern Mississippi.

Career 
Goodin served in the United States Navy for 40 years. After retiring from active duty, he served in the United States Army Reserve and Mississippi Army National Guard. Goodin later worked as an administrator in the Perry County School District and was director of the Perry County Vocational Technical Center. He was elected to the Mississippi House of Representatives in November 2019 and assumed office on January 7, 2020.

References 

Living people
1958 births
People from New Orleans
People from Perry County, Mississippi
Educators from Mississippi
Republican Party members of the Mississippi House of Representatives
Mercer County Community College alumni
Western Illinois University alumni
University of Southern Mississippi alumni